"Surrender" is a song by Italian singer Laura Pausini from her eighth album, From the Inside (2002). The song was written by Dane Deviller, Sean Hosein, Steven Smith, and Anthony Anderson. "Surrender" was released on 9 September 2002 in the United States as part of a project aiming to promote the singer in America, and the track reached number one on the Billboard Hot Dance Club Play chart. In 2003, the song was issued across Europe and Australia.

In 2013, Pausini recorded a new version for her greatest hits album, 20 – The Greatest Hits, in a slower tempo.

Live performances

Surrender was performed during the shows of the 2005 World Tour, World Tour 2009 and Inedito World Tour. During the World Tour 2009 shows, the song's rhythm was changed in its entirety, with a new acoustic version, much like the performance available on the San Siro 2007 concert video. The version present in the DVD originated by Inedito is once again the dance version, included in a medley with "Bellissimo così".

Track listings
US maxi-single, digital EP (2002)
 "Surrender" (Mike Rizzo Global Club Mix) – 8:45
 "Surrender" (Ford's Club Mix) – 7:45
 "Surrender" (Nick Flerce's Polarbabies Club) – 8:04
 "Surrender" (Franck Amorous Chillout Mix) – 5:04
 "Surrender" (Lenny B Club Mix) – 8:35
 "Surrender" (Eric Kupper Extended Mix) – 5:52
 "Surrender" (Mike Rizzo Global Dub) – 5:44

Double 12-inch single – US (2002)
 Disc 1 – Side A
 "Surrender" (Mike Rizzo Global Club Mix) – 8:45
 Disc 1 – Side B
 "Surrender" (Nick Fierce's Polarbabies Club Mix) – 8:04
 Disc 2 – Side A
 "Surrender" (Ford's Club Mix) – 7:44
 "Surrender" (Franck Amorous Chillout Mix) – 5:04
 Disc 2 – Side B
 "Surrender" (Lenny B Club Mix) – 8:34
 "Surrender" (Mike Rizzo Global Dub) – 5:44

Digital download (2002)
 "Surrender" (Ultamix) – 3:56

Promo CD single – US (2002)
 "Surrender" (Bastone & Burnz Raise My Hands Mix) – 8:34
 "Surrender" (Bastone & Burnz Give In Mix) – 7:15
 "Surrender" (Bastone & Burnz Radio Mix) – 3:49

CD single – Europe (2003)
 "Surrender" (Ultramix) – 3:56
 "Surrender" (Mike Taylor Radio Mix) - 4:06
 "Surrender" (Eric Kupper Mix) – 4:06
 "Surrender" (Mike Rizzo Mix) – 4:05

CD single – Australia (2003)
 "Surrender" (Ultamix) – 3:57
 "Surrender" (Mike Rizzo Global Club Mix) – 8:47
 "Surrender" (Lenny B. Club Mix) – 8:36
 "Surrender" (Ford's Club Mix) – 7:45
 "Surrender" (Toronto Chilled Edit) – 3:26

Maxi CD single – Germany (2003)
 "Surrender" (Ultamix) – 3:58
 "Surrender" (Mark Taylor Radio Mix) – 4:09
 "Surrender" (Mike Rizzo Radio Mix) – 4:05
 "Surrender" (Toronto Chilled Edit) – 5:05

CD single – Germany (2003)
 "Surrender" (Ultamix) – 3:57
 "Surrender" (Mike Rizzo Global Club Mix) – 8:45

Charts

Weekly charts

Year-end charts

Release history

See also
 List of number-one dance singles of 2003 (U.S.)

References

Laura Pausini songs
2002 singles
2002 songs
Atlantic Records singles
Compagnia Generale del Disco singles
East West Records singles
Songs written by Dane Deviller
Songs written by Sean Hosein